Schematics is the third studio album by the American pop rock band Zolof the Rock & Roll Destroyer. The album was released on September 25, 2007 through Le Pamplemousse Records (run by band member Rachel Minton) and FlightPlan Records.

Track listing

External links
 Official artist website

2007 albums
Zolof the Rock & Roll Destroyer albums